This is a list of radio and television broadcasting stations in the United States that are currently assigned three-letter call signs.

Overview

In the United States, all radio and television broadcasting stations that are licensed by the Federal Communications Commission (FCC) are assigned official, and unique, call signs. Organized broadcasting began in the U.S. in the early 1920s on the AM band — FM and television did not exist yet. Initially most broadcasting stations were assigned three-letter calls; however, a switch was made in April 1922 to primarily four-letter calls, after the number of stations had increased into the hundreds. For a few years thereafter a small number of new three-letter calls continued to be issued. Although most of the original three-letter calls were randomly assigned, these later calls were often specially requested to match station slogans. The last new three-letter call was assigned to station WIS (now WVOC) in Columbia, South Carolina on January 23, 1930. Since then, three-letter calls have only been assigned to stations, including FM (beginning in 1943) and TV (beginning in 1946), which are historically related to an AM station that was originally issued that call sign.

This review only includes FCC-licensed stations. Not included are unlicensed operations, such as carrier current, cable TV, and Internet stations — for example, San Diego State University's "KCR" — which have adopted call-letter-like identifiers that are not officially issued by the FCC. Also not included are stations which use, as slogans, three-letter truncations of their official four-letter call signs; for example, the full call sign for radio station "KOH" in Reno, Nevada is actually KKOH, and "WTN" in Nashville, Tennessee is actually WWTN. In addition, stations which formerly had three letters but have since changed (such as Albuquerque, New Mexico's KKOB, formerly KOB) are not listed.

, there are a total of 103 AM, FM and TV stations in the United States that are assigned three-letter call signs. This is divided between only 67 different three-letter calls, because in many cases the same call sign is used by more than one station, although a given call sign is never assigned to more than one AM, FM or TV station. These 67 different three-letter call signs are currently grouped as follows:

25 assigned only to an AM station
8 assigned only to an FM station
6 assigned only to a TV station
13 assigned to both an AM and an FM station
7 assigned to both an AM and a TV station
8 assigned to an AM, FM, and TV station

Assignments

Listed below are all the assignments :

AM radio (53 stations)

FM radio (29 stations)
In cases where an AM station exists with the same "base" call letters as an FM station, the FM station is required to include an "-FM" suffix as part of its call sign. If no AM station is currently using the same base call sign, then the "-FM" suffix is optional.

Television (21 stations)
As with FM stations, if an AM station currently exists with the same "base" call, a TV station must include a suffix to differentiate itself, but this suffix is optional if no AM station currently exists. TV stations may select either "-TV" or "-DT" as their suffix.

Other stations of note

WWV - Fort Collins, Colorado — shortwave time signal data radio clock service operated by the National Institute of Standards and Technology
KPH - Bolinas, California — shortwave morse code data  service operated by radiomarine.org under the auspices of the National Park Service

References

External links
Media Bureau Call Sign Actions (Monthly U.S. Federal Communications Commission Public Notices)
Call Sign Search (FCC Licensing and Management System)

See also
List of local television stations in North and Central America
Lists of radio stations in North and Central America

Call signs
American television-related lists
Lists of mass media in the United States